The Gazette is a Pulitzer Prize-winning daily newspaper based in Colorado Springs, Colorado, United States. It has operated since 1873.

History

The publication began as Out West, beginning March 23, 1872, but failed in its endeavor. The company relaunched as The Colorado Springs Gazette, and the first issue was published on January 4, 1873.

In 1946, the Colorado Springs Gazette and the Colorado Springs Evening Telegraph merged to form the Colorado Springs Gazette-Telegraph. The same year, it was purchased by Raymond C. Hoiles's Freedom Newspapers.

An ad by a Colorado Springs-based Sears store in the Colorado Springs Gazette-Telegraph in December 1955 with a misprinted telephone number to call Santa Claus sparked numerous Christmas Eve telephone calls by children on December 24, 1955, to the Continental Air Defense Command Operations Center in Colorado Springs, asking about Santa Claus, and led to the current NORAD Tracks Santa program.

The paper was awarded the Pulitzer Prize in 1990 for feature writing on a home explosion. It was also awarded the Pulitzer Prize in 2014 for national reporting for reporting by David Philipps "... expanding the examination of how wounded combat veterans are mistreated, focusing on loss of benefits for life after discharge by the Army for minor offenses, stories augmented with digital tools and stirring congressional action". Philipps left the Gazette soon after, moving to The New York Times.  Its name was changed to The Gazette in 1997.

The sale of The Gazette to Clarity Media, a subsidiary of the Anschutz Corporation, closed on November 30, 2012. Joe Hight of The Oklahoman (Oklahoma City), another Anschutz-owned newspaper, was named editor. 

In late 2020, The Gazette launched The Denver Gazette, a conservative online newspaper.

Editorials 
The Gazette's op-ed section and editorials leans politically conservative and tend to favor Republican politicians and policies.

See also

Chuck Asay
Robert H. Jackson (photographer)
Wayne Laugesen
Al Lewis

References

External links
 
 Official mobile website

Newspapers published in Colorado
Mass media in Colorado Springs, Colorado
Pulitzer Prize-winning newspapers
Newspapers established in 1946
1946 establishments in Colorado
Anschutz Corporation
Freedom Communications